Borogol is a rural locality (an ulus) in Barguzinsky District, Republic of Buryatia, Russia. The population was 288 as of 2010. There are 3 streets.

Geography 
Borogol is located 69 km northeast of Barguzin (the district's administrative centre) by road. Khilgana is the nearest rural locality.

References 

Rural localities in Barguzinsky District